The  New Zealand DSG class is a type of diesel-electric shunting locomotive used in New Zealand. The class shares a central cab design with the smaller DSC class shunting locomotive, and is twin-engined. Meanwhile, the very similarly designed, single-engined DSJ class, has a cab that is offset from the centre.

Introduction 
The DSG class shunters were built in four batches from 1981 to 1983. The first batch of six locomotives was introduced in 1981, followed by batches in 1982 and 1983.

In Service 
The locomotives have seen widespread use throughout New Zealand, particularly in larger yards and for port traffic. They also see service on sections of mainline, performing regional shunt duties in a number of areas.

Livery 
All DSG class locomotives are in the KiwiRail Mark 2 colour scheme (Vertical separations of main colours on car body).

References

Citations

Bibliography

External links

Diesel-electric locomotives of New Zealand
3 ft 6 in gauge locomotives of New Zealand
Railway locomotives introduced in 1981